, also known by the stage name , was a Japanese voice actress. Yamauchi voiced Itchy and Maude Flanders on the Japanese dub of The Simpsons. Sayuri was formerly affiliated with Kyu Production and affiliated with Aigumi at the time of her death. On March 6, 2012, Yamauchi died of cancer and was 55 years old at the time of her death.

Voice roles

Anime
The Big O: Vera Ronstadt
The Brave Fighter of Legend Da-Garn: Hikaru Kosaka
Crayon Shin-chan: Nanako Ohara, Lulu Lu Lulu
Cyborg 009: 0012
Fullmetal Alchemist: Brotherhood: Satella
The King of Braves GaoGaiGar: Primada, Ikumi Kaidou, Ai Amami (Mamoru's mom)
Saint of Braves Baan Gaan: Astral
Mobile Suit Gundam Wing and Gundam Wing: Endless Waltz: Lady Une
Outlaw Star: "Twilight" Suzuka
Samurai Champloo: Osuzu
Shaman King: Maya
Shamanic Princess: Tiara

Dubbing

Live-action
A.I. Artificial Intelligence: Monica Swinton (Frances O'Connor)
Erin Brockovich: Donna Jensen (Marg Helgenberger)
The Long Kiss Goodnight: Trin (Melina Kanakaredes)
Love, Honour and Obey: Sadie (Sadie Frost)
The Matrix: Switch (Belinda McClory)
Mission: Impossible: Claire Phelps (Emmanuelle Béart)
Pecker: Precinct Captain (Mink Stole)
The Sea Inside: Rosa (Lola Dueñas)
Suspiria (1998 DVD edition): Miss Tanner (Alida Valli)
Twin Peaks: Audrey Horne (Sherilyn Fenn)

Animation
The Simpsons: Itchy; Maude Flanders

References

External links
 
Aigumi

1956 births
2012 deaths
Japanese video game actresses
Japanese voice actresses
Voice actresses from Tokyo
Deaths from cancer in Japan